Australian Brangus are a polled breed of beef cattle, developed in the tropical coastal areas of Queensland, Australia by crossbreeding Brahman  and Angus  cattle during the 1950s.

History
Brangus were first developed in the United States and later developed independently in Australia as the Australian Brangus. The breed was produced to establish higher tick and heat tolerance than that of other cattle breeds. They are a widely used source of meat throughout Australia and exported to countries such as Japan and America.

Benefits 
The Australian Brangus cattle are about  Brahman and  Angus in their genetic makeup, however, the Brahman content can range from 25% to 75%. This allows beef producers to select cattle suitable for their local environment. The cattle are predominantly a sleek black in colour, but red Brangus are also bred. They have a very low rate of eye cancer, which can be a problem in many white faced breeds. Their head is of a medium length with a broad muzzle and forehead. Australian Brangus are also good walkers and foragers and "do well" in a wide variety of situations. 

The Australian Brangus Cattle Association Ltd. performance records the herd using the internationally recognized Breedplan for monitoring fertility, growth, milk and carcase quality.

References

Stephens, M (et al.), Handbook of Australian Livestock, Australian Meat & Livestock Export Corporation, 2000 (4th ed), 

"The Land Stock Types"

External links
 Australian Brangus Cattle Association

Cattle breeds originating in Australia
Cattle breeds